The Garden Island Indian Cemetery, also designated 20CX12, is an archaeological site  and Ojibwe burial site. located on Garden Island in Charlevoix County, Michigan. It was listed on the National Register of Historic Places in 1978.

The Indian Cemetery holds about 3500 graves, and has been called the largest Indian cemetery in the United States. Spirit houses mark some graves, headstones mark others, and the older graves are unmarked. Most graves date from 1851 to 1935.

References

Buildings and structures completed in 1851
National Register of Historic Places in Charlevoix County, Michigan
Archaeological sites on the National Register of Historic Places in Michigan
Cemeteries on the National Register of Historic Places in Michigan
Michigan State Historic Sites